Ivalee is a census-designated place and unincorporated community in Etowah County, Alabama, United States. Its population was 879 as of the 2010 census.

Demographics

References

Census-designated places in Etowah County, Alabama
Census-designated places in Alabama
Unincorporated communities in Etowah County, Alabama
Unincorporated communities in Alabama